The Motivation is a 2013 documentary film that premiered at the Tribeca Film Festival. In the film, eight of the world's best pro-skateboarders prepare for the upcoming Street League Skateboarding Championship in New York City. Each equally talented, they all must overcome unique challenges - family pressures, injuries, money, fame and their own internal struggles - for a chance to win $200,000 and the title of best street-skateboarder in the world. The film received a limited theatrical release in the United States on June 30, 2013 and a VOD release on August 6, 2013. It topped the iTunes documentary charts for two weeks in a row upon release.

Cast

 Steve Berra as himself
 Chris Cole as himself
 Rob Dyrdek as himself
 Nyjah Huston as himself
 Eric Koston as himself
 Luan Oliveira as himself 
 Sean Malto as himself
 Chaz Ortiz as himself
 Paul Rodriguez, Jr as himself
 Jereme Rogers as himself
 Bastien Salabanzi as himself
 Ryan Sheckler as himself

References

External links
 
 http://insidemovies.ew.com/2013/03/12/tribeca-espn-film-festival/
 http://twitchfilm.com/2013/07/whats-the-motivation-dont-be-a-p----.html
 

2013 films
2013 documentary films
American sports documentary films
Skateboarding films
Documentary films about competitions
2010s English-language films
2010s American films